Hopley is an English surname. Notable people with the surname include:

Arthur Hopley (1906–1981), British Anglican priest
Catherine Cooper Hopley (1817–1911), English author and naturalist
Damian Hopley (born 1970), English former rugby union player
Edward Hopley (1816–1869), English painter
Geoffrey Hopley (1891-1915), English cricketer
Georgia Hopley (1858–1944), American journalist, political figure, and prohibition agent
John Hopley (athlete), (1883–1951), South African sportsman
John Hopley (editor) (1821–1904), British-American newspaperman from Ohio
Hannes Hopley (born 1981), South African discus thrower
Lizzie Hopley (also known as Elizabeth Hopley), British actress and writer
Mark Hopley (born 1984), English rugby union player

See also
Hopley Yeaton (1739–1812), the first officer commissioned into the U.S. Revenue Cutter Service
Cornell George Hopley-Woolrich, (1903–1968), American novelist and shortstory writer

Surnames of English origin